The UK based National Student Drama Festival (NSDF) was founded in 1956 with the purpose of creating new art, new artists and new communities. It also runs a charity aimed at empowering young artists. The NSDF is targeted towards people aged 16–25 years old (in 2021–22 they extended the age bracket to include 26-year olds).

NSDF is a year-round organization whose work peaks at its annual festival: for one week, in one chosen city. There is a daily magazine, Noises Off, written by a team of writers and participants at the festival.

History 

The NSDF was founded in 1956 by the Sunday Times arts columnist Kenneth Pearson, Sunday Times theatre critic Harold Hobson, and National Union of Students (United Kingdom) president Frank Copplestone. Pearson went on to become the organization's first artistic director. Early supporters also included Sunday Times Editor Harry Hodson and Professor Glynne Wickham, a pioneer of the academic discipline of drama based at the University of Bristol.  

Even before 1956, The National Union of Students had organised dramatic festivals, like in 1947 at Birmingham, but this was the first year that it had been backed by the Sunday Times. 

Scottish universities that were a part of the Scottish Union of Students were not allowed to participate till 1962, as universities not affiliated with the National Union of Students were not allowed to participate before that year.

On it's 50'th anniversary in 2006, a book was published called "Fifty years of the National Student Drama Festival: Oberon Books 2005". This book included a full list of shows for those 50 years.

Past NSDF participants include Harold Pinter, Caryl Churchill, Meera Syal, Simon Russell Beale, Ruth Wilson, Marianne Elliott, and Lucy Prebble. Companies with past affiliation with NSDF include Slung Low, Jamie Lloyd Productions, RashDash, Barrel Organ and LUNG Theatre. 

NSDF 22 took place from 9–15 April 2022 in Leicester.

Key Figures

Festival Directors
 1971 to 2000 – Clive Wolfe
 2001 to 2003 – Nick Stimson
 2004 to 2006 – Andrew Loretto
 2007 to 2012 – Holly Kendrick
 2013 to 2018 – Michael Brazier
 2019 – James Phillips

Noises Off Editors
 1980 to 1990 – Stephen Jeffreys (latterly in tandem with Nick Phillips)
 1991 to 2002 – Ian Shuttleworth
 2003 to 2004 – Andrew Haydon and Rachel Smyth
 2005 to 2009 – Andrew Haydon
 2010 – Phil Mann and Claire Trévien
 2011 – Andrew Haydon, Phil Mann and Claire Trévien
 2012 – Phil Mann, Andrew Haydon, and Claire Trévien
 2013 to 2014 – Andrew Haydon
 2015 – Jake Orr
 2016 to 2017 – Richard Tzanov
 2018 – Kate Wyver
 2019 – Florence Bell and Naomi Obeng

Notable Participants
 Erica Whyman
 Rosemary Squire
 Stephen Fry
 Abbi Greenland and Helen Goalen (RASHDASDH)
 Carrie Cracknell
 Ruth Wilson
 Lena Headey
 Wole Soyinka
 Sandi Toksvig
 Caryl Churchill
 Tim Fountain
 Nick Hern
 Biyi Bandele
 Terry Hands
 Nona Shepphard (director)
 Michael Boyd
 Robin Duval
 Sam Steiner (playwright)
 Braham Murray
 Olivia Vinall (actor)
 Khalid Abdalla
 Nikki Amuka-Bird
 Michael Attenborough
 Van Badham
 Patrick Barlow
 Simon Russell Beale
 Lorna Bennett
 Michael Billington
 David Farr
 Mark Gatiss
 Buzz Goodbody
 Robert Hewison
 Harold Hobson
 Angus Imrie
 Stephen Jeffreys
 Martin Jenkins
 Alex Jennings
 Daniel Kitson
 Roger Michell
 John Nettles
 Cyril Nri
 Steve Pemberton
 Ronald Pickup
 Tim Pigott-Smith
 Harold Pinter
 Pete Postlethwaite
 Lucy Prebble
 Mark Ravenhill
 Jan Sayer
 Prunella Scales
 Tim Supple
 Meera Syal
 Polly Teale
 Richard Thomas
 Glen Walford
 Timothy West
 Clive Wolfe
 Alan Yentob
 Dmytro Morykit

Prize Winners 
At the end of the festival there is a Closing Ceremony where prizes are presented. Some of which are named after prestigious theatrical institutions or people. For example, the Buzz Goodbody Director Award which was named after the first female director for the RSC, who attended the festival in 1967. Previous winners include Roland Smith (Artistic Director of Theatre Delicatessen), Phil Young, Jane Prowse, Fiona Clift, and Richard Hurst.

2017 Prize Winners 
Named Awards

THE BUZZ GOODBODY DIRECTOR AWARD Ellie Gauge (Thick Skin)

THE STAGE UK DIRECTORS AWARD Josie Davies (Say It Loud)

THE CAMERON MACKINTOSH AWARD Alex Mackinder (Ordinary Days)

THE SUNDAY TIMES HAROLD HOBSON DRAMA CRITIC AWARD Lily James

THEATRE RECORD CRITICS AWARD Florence Bell

THE SUNDAY TIMES PLAYWRITING AWARD Ben Kulvichit & Clara Potter Sweet (Celebration)

SPOTLIGHT MOST PROMISING ACTOR Harvey Comerford (Hidden & Thick Skin)

SPOTLIGHT MOST PROMISING ACTOR Annie Davison (Swallow)

OUTSTANDING CONTRIBUTION TO THE TECHNICAL TEAM SUPPORTED BY SLX Sam Levy 

OUTSTANDING CONTRIBUTION TO THE TECHNICAL TEAM SUPPORTED BY SLX Sam Costelloe 

OUTSTANDING CONTRIBUTION TO THE TECHNICAL TEAM SUPPORTED BY SLX Mel Wells

MANAGEMENT TEAM AWARD Chris Bell

CAMDEN PEOPLE’S THEATRE AWARD Josie Davies

SAMUEL FRENCH NEW PLAY AWARD Caitlin McEwan (Thick Skin)

OBERON BOOKS NEW PLAY AWARD Miriam Schechter (Blackbird)

FRECKLE PRODUCTIONS FAMILY SHOW AWARD Emergency Chorus (Celebration)

THE FESTGOERS’ AWARD Celebration

Judges Awards

OUTSTANDING ACHIEVEMENT IN DESIGN David Callanan for Nothing Is Coming, The Pixels Are Huge

OUTSTANDING ACHIEVEMENT IN MUSIC AND COMPOSITION Oscar Lane, Oliver Rudge and the band from O Collective for he she they

2016 Prize Winners 
Named Awards

THE BUZZ GOODBODY DIRECTOR AWARD Modupe Salu (I Can't Breathe)

THE STAGE UK DIRECTORS AWARD Joe Bunce (Departures: A Song Cycle)

THE CAMERON MACKINTOSH AWARD (Departures: A Song Cycle)

THE SUNDAY TIMES PLAYWRITING AWARD Joe Bunce (Departures: A Song Cycle)

THE SUNDAY TIMES HAROLD HOBSON DRAMA CRITIC AWARD Kate Wyver

SPOTLIGHT MOST PROMISING ACTOR Bróccán Tyzack-Carlin  (The Addams Family)

SPOTLIGHT MOST PROMISING ACTOR Modupe Salu  (I Can't Breathe)

THE FESTGOERS’ AWARD The Addams Family

MANAGEMENT TEAM AWARD Oscar Owen

Judges' Awards

Acting | Sadie Fitch Kempner for Morticia in The Addams Family

Acting | Becca Jones for Sylv in West

Choreography | Will Emery for The Addams Family

Composition | Matthew Malone for Departures

Contribution to the Festival | Durham University Light Opera Group for Kiss Me Kate and The Addams Family

Creative Collaboration | The Company for Daniel (Footprint Theatre)

Design | James Bailey for Departures

Directing and Casting | Josie Davies for Over There

First Time Directing | Jenny Walser for Cock

Judges' Commendations

Acting | Shannon Smith for Mike in West

Acting | Bryony Davies for Karl in Over There

Comedy | Harvey Comerford and Dominic McGovern for the Gangsters in Kiss Me Kate

Composition | Ronan Hatful for Over There

Directing | Elin Schofield for Daniel

Supporting Actor | Jennifer Bullock for Wednesday in The Addams Family

Supporting Actor | James Roscow for Ken and Pat in West

Supporting Actor | Harry Adair for Lurch in The Addams Family and General Harrison in Kiss Me Kate

2015 Prize Winners 
Named Awards

THE BUZZ GOODBODY DIRECTOR AWARD Joe Bunce for The Nutcracker

THE DIRECTORS' GUILD AWARD Matt Stevens-Woodhead for The 56

THE CAMERON MACKINTOSH AWARD The Creative Team and Company of The Nutcracker

SPOTLIGHT MOST PROMISING ACTOR Vincenzo Monachello for his performance in Parade

SPOTLIGHT MOST PROMISING ACTOR Dannielle Phillips for her performance in The 56

THE SUNDAY TIMES HAROLD HOBSON DRAMA CRITIC AWARD Eve Allin

THEATRE RECORD CRITICS AWARD  Becky Shepherson

THE SUNDAY TIMES PLAYWRITING AWARD Josh Overton for Angry

Outstanding Contribution to the Technical Team supported by Stage Electrics   |  Jasmin Davies

Outstanding Contribution to Sound supported by Shure and The Association Of Sound Designers   |  Ali Stringer

Outstanding Contribution to Lighting supported by Ambersphere   |  Caoimhe Young

Management Award   |  Aisling Gallagan

The Festgoers Award   |  The Ritual Slaughter of Gorge Mastromas

Judges’ Awards

Outstanding Performance in a Musical  |  Georgina Ambrey for The Baker’s Wife in Into The Woods

Musical Direction  |  Ash Jacobs for Into The Woods

Ensemble  |  The 56

Theatrical Imagination  |  The Nutcracker

Choreography   |  Beth Hinton-Lever for Parade

Judges' Commendations

Acting  |  Euan Kitson for his performance in Lemons, Lemons, Lemons, Lemons, Lemons

Acting   |  Miriam Schechter for her performance In The Nutcracker

Playwriting  |  Sam Steiner for Lemons, Lemons, Lemons, Lemons, Lemons

Musicianship  |  The Band of Into The Woods

Directing and Producing  |  Ellie Gauge and Sophie McQuillan for Congestion

Sound and Music Design   |  James Melling and David Denyer for The Bacchae

Lighting and Design   |  Aaron Smith for The Dumb Waiter

Mise En Scene  |  David Johnson-Morgan and India Smith for Wastwater

Contribution to Technical Team  |  Fiona Porritt and Conor Morris

Contribution to Sound  |  Olga Kravchenko

Contribution to Lighting  |  Laura Heinl

2014 Prize Winners 
Named Awards

Buzz Goodbody Director Award  |  Ali Pidsley for Road & Nothing

The Sunday Times Play Writing Award  |  Lucyna Raczka for Nothing

The Directors’ Guild Award  |  Genevieve Skehan for Spring Awakening The Musical

Cameron Mackintosh Award  |  Spring Awakening The Musical

The Sunday Times Harold Hobson Student Drama Critic Award  |  Billy Barrett

Theatre Record Young Critic’s Award  |  Georgia Snow and Adam Foster

Spotlight Most Promising Actor Award  |  Angus Imrie for Brink, Skin-Lad, Blowpipe, Soldier, Barry in Road

Spotlight Most Promising Actress Award  |  Katherine Thorogood for Stalker in Nothing

Sound Award supported by Sennheiser and The Association of Sound Designers  |  George Veys

Lighting Award supported by Ambersphere  |  Ruth Luckins

Technical Achievement Award supported by Stage Electrics  |  Matthew Norwood

Management Team Award  |  Alex Williams

Festgoers Award  |  The Duck Pond

Judges’ Company Awards

Creative Risk  |  Nothing

Ensemble  |  Road

Collaborative Creation  |  The Duck Pond

Judges’ Company Commendation

Ensemble  |  Punk Rock

Judges’ Individual Awards

Musical Direction  |  Katy Richardson for Americana

Musical Performance  |  Verity Blythe for Peaches in Americana

Spirit Of Invention  |  Tom Coxon for The Duck Pond

Performance  |  Beth Holmes for Louise, Molly, Mrs Bald and Scotch Girl in Road

Judges’ Individual Commendations

Performance  |  Barnaby Chambers for Bennett in Punk Rock

Video Design  |  Stevie Partington for Enron

Writing  |  Jenna May Hobbs for Your Fragrant Phantom

Musical Performance  |  Hannah Bloom for Wendla in Spring Awakening

Musical Performance  |  Laura Johnson for Jackson in Americana

References 

General
 'Raw Talent : Fifty Years of the National Student Drama Festival'.
 'NSDF Programme 2010' (printed and distributed by the Festival)
 'NSDF Programme 2011'

External links
 National Student Drama Festival

Scarborough, North Yorkshire
Festivals in North Yorkshire
Theatre festivals in England